Vehicular automation involves the use of mechatronics, artificial intelligence, and multi-agent systems to assist the operator of a vehicle (car, aircraft, watercraft, or otherwise). These features and the vehicles employing them may be labeled as intelligent or smart. A vehicle using automation for difficult tasks, especially navigation, to ease but not entirely replace human input, may be referred to as semi-autonomous, whereas a vehicle relying solely on automation is called robotic or autonomous. Both of these types are instantiated in today's various self-driving cars, unmanned surface vehicles, autonomous trains, advanced airliner autopilots, drone aircraft, and planetary rovers, as well as guided rockets and missiles. After the invention of the integrated circuit, the sophistication of automation technology increased. Manufacturers and researchers subsequently added a variety of automated functions to automobiles and other vehicles. The technology involved in implementing autonomous vehicles is very expansive, ranging from technological improvements in the vehicle itself to the environment and objects around the vehicle. As the use of automated vehicles increases, they are becoming more influential in human lives. Although automated vehicles bring various benefits, they also come with various concerns. Also, there are still technological challenges that need to be overcome in order to make vehicular automation robust and scalable.

Overview 

An automated driving system is generally an integrated package of individual automated systems operating in concert. Automated driving implies that the driver has delegated the ability to drive (i.e., all appropriate monitoring, agency, and action functions) to the vehicle automation system. Even though the driver may be alert and ready to take action at any moment, the automation system controls all functions.

Automated driving systems are often conditional, meaning that the automation system is capable of automated driving, but not for all conditions encountered in the course of normal operation.  Therefore, a human driver is functionally required to initiate the automated driving system, and may or may not do so when driving conditions are within the capability of the system. When the vehicle automation system has assumed all driving functions, the human is no longer driving the vehicle but continues to assume responsibility for the vehicle's performance as the vehicle operator. The automated vehicle operator is not functionally required to actively monitor the vehicle's performance while the automation system is engaged, but the operator must be available to resume driving within several seconds of being prompted to do so, as the system has limited conditions of automation. While the automated driving system is engaged, certain conditions may prevent real-time human input, but for no more than a few seconds. The operator is able to resume driving at any time subject to this short delay. When the operator has resumed all driving functions, he or she is the vehicle's driver again.

 Fully autonomous cars and trucks that drive us instead of us driving them will become a reality. These self-driving vehicles ultimately will integrate onto U.S. roadways by progressing through six levels of driver assistance technology advancements in the coming years. This includes everything from no automation (where a fully engaged driver is required at all times), to full autonomy (where an automated vehicle operates independently, without a human driver).

An automated driving system is defined in an proposed amendment to  Article 1 of the Vienna Convention on Road Traffic:

This amendment will enter into force on 14 July 2022, unless it is rejected before 13 January 2022.

Autonomy levels

Autonomy in vehicles is often categorized in six levels: The level system was developed by the Society of Automotive Engineers (SAE).

 Level 0: No automation.
 Level 1: Driver assistance - The vehicle can control either steering or speed autonomously in specific circumstances to assist the driver.
 Level 2: Partial automation - The vehicle can control both steering and speed autonomously in specific circumstances to assist the driver.
 Level 3: Conditional automation - The vehicle can control both steering and speed autonomously under normal environmental conditions, but requires driver oversight.
 Level 4: High automation - The vehicle can complete travel autonomously under normal environmental conditions, not requiring driver oversight.
 Level 5: Full autonomy - The vehicle can complete travel autonomously in any environmental conditions.

Level 0 refers, for instance, to vehicles which do not have adaptive cruise control.

Level 1 and 2 refer to vehicles where one part of the driving task is performed by the vehicle advanced driver-assistance systems (ADAS) under the responsibility/accountability/liability of the driver.

From level 3, the driver can conditionally transfer the driving task to the vehicle, but the driver must take back control when the conditional automation is no longer available. For instance an automated traffic jam pilot can drive in the traffic jam but the driver should take back control when traffic jam is over.

Level 5 refers to a vehicle which does not need any (human) driver.

"Level 2+" or "semi-automated" is a kind of enhanced level 2 where some manufacturers are ready to provide more features than the basic features of a level 2 system, but manufacturers and regulators are not yet ready for SAE level 3. This led to the introduction of the informal notion of "enhanced level 2" or "level 2+" or "semi-automated" — a dominant ADAS trend in 2021  —  which is a level 2 with additional safety and comfort. For instance, a low cost level 2+ vehicle can include interior-monitoring technologies to ensure driver attention, adaptive merging for when vehicles are entering or exiting the highway, and new kinds of enhanced automatic emergency braking (AEB) for pedestrian, cyclist and motorcyclist safety. Level 2+ can also include lane change and overtaking.

The levels can be roughly understood as Level 0 - no automation; Level 1 - hands on/shared control; Level 2 - hands off; Level 3 - eyes off; Level 4 - mind off, and Level 5 - steering wheel optional.

, level 3 remains a marginal portion of the market, with only one hundred level 3 Honda Legend cars available in the Japanese market. It is possible that level 3 remains a marginal portion of the market until 2025.

Technology used in vehicular automation 
The primary means of implementing autonomous vehicles is through the use of Artificial Intelligence (AI). In order for full autonomous vehicles to be implemented, the lower levels of automation must be thoroughly tested and implemented before moving on to the next level. Through implementing autonomous systems, such as navigation, collision avoidance and steering, autonomous vehicle manufacturers work towards higher levels of autonomy by designing and implementing different systems of the car. These autonomous systems, along with the use of artificial intelligence methods, can use the machine learning aspect of AI in order for the vehicle to control each of the other autonomous systems and processes. Thus, autonomous vehicle manufacturers are researching and developing appropriate AI specifically for autonomous vehicles. While many of these companies are continuously developing technologies to be implemented into their autonomous vehicles, the general consensus is that the underlying technology is still in need of further development before fully autonomous vehicles are possible.

Arguably one of the most important systems of any autonomous vehicle, the perception system must be fully developed and well-tested in order for autonomy to advance. With the development and implementation of the perception system on autonomous vehicles, much of the safety standards of autonomous vehicles are being addressed by this system, which places an unequivocal emphasis on it to be flawless, as human lives would be subject to harm if a faulty system were to be developed. The main purpose for the perception system is to constantly scan the surrounding environment and determine which objects in the environment pose a threat to vehicles. In a sense, the perception system's main goal is to act like human perception, allowing the system to sense hazards and to prepare or correct for these hazards. In terms of the detection part of the perception system, many solutions are being tested for accuracy and compatibility, such as radar, lidar, sonar and moving image processing.

With the development of these autonomous subsystems of the car, autonomous vehicle manufacturers have already developed systems which act as assistance features on a vehicle. These systems are known as advanced driver-assistance systems, and contain systems to do such actions as parallel parking and emergency braking. Along these systems, autonomous navigation systems play a role in the development of autonomous vehicles. In implementing the navigation system, there are two ways in which navigation can be implemented: sensing from one vehicle to another or sensing from the infrastructure. These navigation systems would work in tandem with already well established navigation systems, such as the Global Positioning System (GPS), and be able to process route information, detecting such things as traffic jams, tolls and or road construction. From this information, the vehicle can then take the appropriate action to either avoid the area or plan accordingly. However, there may be problems in using this method, such as outdated information, in which case vehicle to infrastructure communication can play a large role in constantly having up-to-date information. An instance of this is having street signs and other regulatory markers display information to the vehicle, which allows the vehicle to make decisions based on the current information.

Along with the development of autonomous vehicles, many of these vehicles are expected to be primarily electric, meaning that the main power source of the vehicle will be electric-based rather than fossil fuel-based. Along with that, there comes the extra demand on autonomous vehicle manufacturers to produce higher quality electric cars in order to implement all the autonomous systems associated with the vehicle. However, much of modern-day vehicle components can still be used in autonomous vehicles, such as the use of the automatic transmissions and operator protection equipment like airbags.

In consideration of the development of autonomous vehicles, companies also are considering operator preferences and needs. These instances include allowing the user to minimize time, follow a precise route and accommodate any possible disabilities that the operator may have. Along with accommodating the driver, autonomous vehicles also impose a technological factor onto the environment around it, generally needing a higher sense of connectivity in the vehicle's environment. With this new factor to consider, many urban governments are considering becoming a smart city in order to provide a sufficient foundation for autonomous vehicles. Along these same lines of the vehicle's environment accommodating the vehicle, the user of these vehicles may also have to be technologically connected in order to operate these autonomous vehicles. With the advent of smartphones, it is predicted that autonomous vehicles will be able to have this connection with the user's smartphone or other technological devices similar to a smartphone.

Success in the technology 
AAA Foundation for Traffic Safety conducted a test of two automatic emergency braking systems: those designed to prevent crashes and others that aim to make a crash less severe. The test looked at popular models like the 2016 Volvo XC90, Subaru Legacy, Lincoln MKX, Honda Civic and Volkswagen Passat. Researchers tested how well each system stopped when approaching both a moving and nonmoving target. It found that systems capable of preventing crashes reduced vehicle speeds by twice that of the systems designed to merely mitigate crash severity. When the two test vehicles traveled within 30 mph of each other, even those designed to simply lessen crash severity avoided crashes 60 percent of the time.

The success in the automated driving system has been known to be successful in situations like rural road settings. Rural road settings would be a setting in which there is lower amounts of traffic and lower differentiation between driving abilities and types of drivers. "The greatest challenge in the development of automated functions is still inner-city traffic, where an extremely wide range of road users must be considered from all directions." This technology is progressing to a more reliable way of the automated driving cars to switch from auto-mode to driver mode. Auto-mode is the mode that is set in order for the automated actions to take over, while the driver mode is the mode set in order to have the operator controlling all functions of the car and taking the responsibilities of operating the vehicle (Automated driving system not engaged).

This definition would include vehicle automation systems that may be available in the near term—such as traffic-jam assist, or full-range automated cruise control—if such systems would be designed such that the human operator can reasonably divert attention (monitoring) away from the performance of the vehicle while the automation system is engaged. This definition would also include automated platooning (such as conceptualized by the SARTRE project).

Sartre 
The Sartre (safe road trains for the environment) project's main goal is to create platooning, a train of automated cars, that will provide comfort and have the ability for the driver of the vehicle to arrive safely to a destination. Along with the ability to be along the train, drivers that are driving past these platoons, can join in with a simple activation of the automated driving system that correlates with a truck that leads the platoon. Sartre is taking what we know as a train system and mixing it with automated driving technology. This is intended to allow for an easier transportation through cities and ultimately help with traffic flow through heavy automobile traffic.

In some parts of the world the self-driving car has been tested in real life situations such as in Pittsburgh. The self-driving Uber has been put to the test around the city, driving with different types of drivers as well as different traffic situations. Not only have there been testing and successful parts to the automated car, but there has also been extensive testing in California on automated busses. The lateral control of the automated buses uses magnetic markers such as the platoon at San Diego, while the longitudinal control of the automated truck platoon uses millimeter wave radio and radar. Current examples around today's society include the Google car and Tesla's models. Tesla has redesigned automated driving, they have created car models that allow drivers to put in the destination and let the car take over.  These are two modern day examples of the automated driving system cars.

Risks and liabilities 

Many automakers such as Ford and Volvo have announced plans to offer fully automated cars in the future. Extensive research and development is being put into automated driving systems, but the biggest problem automakers cannot control is how drivers will use system. Drivers are stressed to stay attentive and safety warnings are implemented to alert the driver when corrective action is needed. Tesla Motor's has one recorded incident that resulted in a fatality involving the automated driving system in the Tesla Model S. The accident report reveals the accident was a result of the driver being inattentive and the autopilot system not recognizing the obstruction ahead.

Another flaw with automated driving systems is that in situations where unpredictable events such as weather or the driving behavior of others may cause fatal accidents due to sensors that monitor the surroundings of the vehicle not being able to provide corrective action.

To overcome some of the challenges for automated driving systems, novel methodologies based on virtual testing, traffic flow simulation and digital prototypes have been proposed, especially when novel algorithms based on Artificial Intelligence approaches are employed which require extensive training and validation data sets.

The implementation of automated driving systems poses the possibility of changing build environments in urban areas, such as the expansion of suburban areas due to the increased ease of mobility.

Challenges 
Around 2015, several self-driving car companies including Nissan and Toyota promised self-driving cars by 2020. However, the predictions turned out to be far too optimistic.

There are still many obstacles in developing fully autonomous Level 5 vehicles, which is able to operate in any conditions. Currently, companies are focused on Level 4 automation, which is able to operate under certain environmental circumstances.

There is still debate about what an autonomous vehicle should look like. For example, whether to incorporate lidar to autonomous driving systems is still being argued. Some researchers have come up with algorithms utilizing camera-only data that achieve the performance that rival those of lidar. On the other hand, camera-only data sometimes draw inaccurate bounding boxes, and thus lead to poor predictions. This is due to the nature of superficial information that stereo cameras provide, whereas incorporating lidar gives autonomous vehicles precise distance to each point on the vehicle.

Technical challenges 

 Software Integration: Because of the large number of sensors and safety processes required by autonomous vehicles, software integration remains a challenging task. A robust autonomous vehicle should ensure that the integration of hardware and software can recover from component failures.
 Prediction and trust among autonomous vehicles: Fully autonomous cars should be able to anticipate the actions of other cars like humans do. Human drivers are great at predicting other drivers' behaviors, even with a small amount of data such as eye contact or hand gestures. In the first place, the cars should agree on traffic rules, whose turn it is to drive in an intersection, and so on. This scales into a larger issue when there exists both human-operated cars and self-driving cars due to more uncertainties. A robust autonomous vehicle is expected to improve on understanding the environment better to address this issue.
 Scaling up: The coverage of autonomous vehicles testing could not be accurate enough. In cases where heavy traffic and obstruction exist, it requires faster response time or better tracking algorithms from the autonomous vehicles. In cases where unseen objects are encountered, it's important that the algorithms are able to track these objects and avoid collisions.

These features require numerous sensors, many of which rely on micro-electro-mechanical systems (MEMS) to maintain a small size, high efficiency, and low cost. Foremost among MEMS sensors in vehicles are accelerometers and gyroscopes to measure acceleration around multiple orthogonal axes — critical to detecting and controlling the vehicle's motion.

Societal challenges 
One critical step to achieve the implementation of autonomous vehicles is the acceptance by the general public. It is an important ongoing research because it provides guidelines for the automobile industry to improve their design and technology. Studies have shown that many people believe that using autonomous vehicles is safer, which underlines the necessity for the automobile companies to assure that autonomous vehicles improve safety benefits. The TAM research model breaks down important factors that affect the consumer's acceptance into: usefulness, ease to use, trust, and social influence.

 The usefulness factor studies whether or not autonomous vehicles are useful in that they provide benefits that save consumers' time and make their lives simpler. How well the consumers believe autonomous vehicles will be useful compared to other forms of transportation solutions is a determining factor.
 The ease to use factor studies the user-friendliness of the autonomous vehicles. While the notion that consumers care more about ease to use than safety has been challenged, it still remains an important factor that has indirect effects on the public's intention to use autonomous vehicles.
 The trust factor studies the safety, data privacy and security protection of autonomous vehicles. A more trusted system has a positive impact on the consumer's decision to use autonomous vehicles.
 The social influence factor studies whether the influence of others would influence consumer's likelihood of having autonomous vehicles. Studies have shown that the social influence factor is positively related to behavioral intention. This might be due to the fact that cars traditionally serve as a status symbol that represents one's intent to use and his social environment.

Regulatory challenges 
Real-time testing of autonomous vehicles is an inevitable part of the process. At the same time, vehicular automation regulators are faced with challenges to protect public safety and yet allow autonomous vehicle companies to test their products. Groups representing autonomous vehicle companies are resisting most regulations, whereas groups representing vulnerable road users and traffic safety are pushing for regulatory barriers. To improve traffic safety, the regulators are encouraged to find a middle ground that protects the public from immature technology while allowing autonomous vehicle companies to test the implementation of their systems. There have also been proposals to adopt the aviation automation safety regulatory knowledge into the discussions of safe implementation of autonomous vehicles, due to the experience that has been gained over the decades by the aviation sector on safety topics.

Ground vehicles 

Ground vehicles employing automation and teleoperation include shipyard gantries, mining trucks, bomb-disposal robots, robotic insects, and driverless tractors.

There are a lot of autonomous and semi-autonomous ground vehicles being made for the purpose of transporting passengers. One such example is the free-ranging on grid (FROG) technology which consists of autonomous vehicles, a magnetic track and a supervisory system. The FROG system is deployed for industrial purposes in factory sites and has been in use since 1999 on the ParkShuttle, a PRT-style public transport system in the city of Capelle aan den IJssel to connect the Rivium business park with the neighboring city of Rotterdam (where the route terminates at the Kralingse Zoom metro station). The system experienced a crash in 2005 that proved to be caused by a human error.

Applications for automation in ground vehicles include the following:
 Vehicle tracking system system ESITrack, Lojack
 Rear-view alarm, to detect obstacles behind.
 Anti-lock braking system (ABS) (also Emergency Braking Assistance (EBA)), often coupled with Electronic brake force distribution (EBD), which prevents the brakes from locking and losing traction while braking. This shortens stopping distances in most cases and, more importantly, allows the driver to steer the vehicle while braking.
 Traction control system (TCS) actuates brakes or reduces throttle to restore traction if driven wheels begin to spin.
 Four wheel drive (AWD) with a centre differential. Distributing power to all four wheels lessens the chances of wheel spin. It also suffers less from oversteer and understeer.
 Electronic Stability Control (ESC) (also known for Mercedes-Benz proprietary Electronic Stability Program (ESP), Acceleration Slip Regulation (ASR) and Electronic differential lock (EDL)). Uses various sensors to intervene when the car senses a possible loss of control. The car's control unit can reduce power from the engine and even apply the brakes on individual wheels to prevent the car from understeering or oversteering.
 Dynamic steering response (DSR) corrects the rate of power steering system to adapt it to vehicle's speed and road conditions.

Research is ongoing and prototypes of autonomous ground vehicles exist.

Cars 

Extensive automation for cars focuses on either introducing robotic cars or modifying modern car designs to be semi-autonomous.

Semi-autonomous designs could be implemented sooner as they rely less on technology that is still at the forefront of research. An example is the dual mode monorail. Groups such as RUF (Denmark) and TriTrack (USA) are working on projects consisting of specialized private cars that are driven manually on normal roads but also that dock onto a monorail/guideway along which they are driven autonomously.

As a method of automating cars without extensively modifying the cars as much as a robotic car, Automated highway systems (AHS) aims to construct lanes on highways that would be equipped with, for example, magnets to guide the vehicles. Automation vehicles have auto-brakes named as Auto Vehicles Braking System (AVBS). Highway computers would manage the traffic and direct the cars to avoid crashes.

In 2006, The European Commission has established a smart car development program called the Intelligent Car Flagship Initiative.  The goals of that program include:

 Adaptive cruise control
 Lane departure warning system
 Project AWAKE for drowsy drivers

There are plenty of further uses for automation in relation to cars. These include:

 Assured Clear Distance Ahead
 Adaptive headlamps
 Advanced Automatic Collision Notification, such as OnStar
 Intelligent Parking Assist System
 Automatic Parking
 Automotive night vision with pedestrian detection
 Blind spot monitoring
 Driver Monitoring System
 Robotic car or self-driving car which may result in less-stressed "drivers", higher efficiency (the driver can do something else), increased safety and less pollution (e.g. via completely automated fuel control)
 Precrash system
 Safe speed governing
 Traffic sign recognition
 Following another car on a motorway – "enhanced" or "adaptive" cruise control, as used by Ford and Vauxhall
 Distance control assist – as developed by Nissan
 Dead man's switch – there is a move to introduce deadman's braking into automotive application, primarily heavy vehicles, and there may also be a need to add penalty switches to cruise controls.

Singapore also announced a set of provisional national standards on January 31, 2019, to guide the autonomous vehicle industry. The standards, known as Technical Reference 68 (TR68), will promote the safe deployment of fully driverless vehicles in Singapore, according to a joint press release by Enterprise Singapore (ESG), Land Transport Authority (LTA), Standards Development Organisation and Singapore Standards Council (SSC).

Shuttle 

Since 1999, the 12-seat/10-standing ParkShuttle has been operating on an  exclusive right of way in the city of Capelle aan den IJssel in The Netherlands. The system uses small magnets in the road surface to allow the vehicle to determine its position.  The use of shared autonomous vehicles was trialed around 2012 in a hospital car park in Portugal. From 2012 to 2016 the European Union funded CityMobil2 project examined the use of shared autonomous vehicles and passenger experience including short term trials in seven cities. This project led to the development of the EasyMile EZ10.

In the 2010s, self-driving shuttle became able to run in mixed traffic without the need for embedded guidance markers.  So far the focus has been on low speed, with short, fixed routes for the "last mile" of journeys.  This means issues of collision avoidance and safety are significantly less challenging than those for automated cars, which seek to match the performance of conventional vehicles.  Many trials have been undertaken, mainly on quiet roads with little traffic or on public pathways or private roadways and specialised test sites.  The capacity of different models varies significantly, between 6-seats and 20-seats.  (Above this size there are conventional buses that have driverless technology installed.)

In December 2016, the Jacksonville Transportation Authority has announced its intention to replace the Jacksonville Skyway monorail with driverless vehicles that would run on the existing elevated superstructure as well as continue onto ordinary roads.  The project has since been named the "Ultimate Urban Circulator" or "U2C" and testing has been carried out on shuttles from six different manufacturers.  The cost of the project is estimated at $379 million.

In January 2017, it was announced the ParkShuttle system in the Netherlands will be renewed and expanded including extending the route network beyond the exclusive right of way so vehicles will run in mixed traffic on ordinary roads.  The plans were delayed and the extension into mixed traffic is now expected in 2021.

In July 2018, Baidu stated it had built 100 of its 8-seat Apolong model, with plans for commercial sales. As of July 2021 they have not gone into volume production.

In August 2020, it was reported there were 25 autonomous shuttle manufacturers, including the 2GetThere, Local Motors, Navya, Baidu, Easymile, Toyota and Ohmio.

In December 2020, Toyota showcased it's 20-passenger "e-Palette" vehicle, which is due to be used at the 2021 Tokyo Olympic Games.  Toyota has announced it intends to have the vehicle available for commercial applications before 2025.

In January 2021, Navya released an investor report which predicted global autonomous shuttle sales will reach 12,600 units by 2025, with a market value of EUR 1.7 billion.

In June 2021, Chinese maker Yutong claimed to have delivered 100 models of its 10-seat Xiaoyu 2.0 autonomous bus for use in Zhengzhou.  Testing has been carried out in a number of cities since 2019 with trials open to the public due to commence in July 2021.

Self-driving shuttles are already in use on some private roads, such as at the Yutong factory in Zhengzhou where they are used to transport workers between buildings of the world's largest bus factory.

Trials 
A large number of trials have been conducted since 2016, with most involving only one vehicle on a short route for a short period of time and with an onboard conductor.  The purpose of the trials has been to both provide technical data and to familiarize the public with the driverless technology. A 2021 survey of over 100 shuttle experiments across Europe concluded that low speed -  - was the major the barrier to implementation of autonomous shuttle buses.  The current cost of the vehicles at €280,000 and the need for onboard attendants were also issues.

 

Vehicle names are in "quotes"

Buses 

Autonomous buses are proposed as well as self driving cars and trucks. Grade 2 level automated minibuses were trialed for a few weeks in Stockholm. China has also a small fleet of self-driving public buses in the tech district of Shenzhen, Guangdong.

The first autonomous bus trial in the United Kingdom commenced in mid-2019, with an Alexander Dennis Enviro200 MMC single-decker bus modified with autonomous software from Fusion Processing able to operate in driverless mode within Stagecoach Manchester's Sharston bus depot, performing tasks such as driving to the washing station, refuelling point and then parking up at a dedicated parking space in the depot. Passenger-carrying driverless bus trials in Scotland commenced in January 2023, with a fleet of five identical vehicles to the Manchester trial used on a  Stagecoach Fife park-and-ride route across the Forth Road Bridge, from the north bank of the Forth to Edinburgh Park station.

Another autonomous trial in Oxfordshire, England, which uses a battery electric Fiat Ducato minibus on a circular service to Milton Park, operated by FirstBus with support from Fusion Processing, Oxfordshire County Council and the University of the West of England, entered full passenger service also in January 2023. The trial route is planned to be extended to Didcot Parkway railway station following the acquisition of a larger single-decker by the end of 2023.

In July 2020 in Japan, AIST Human-Centered Mobility Research Center with Nippon Koei and Isuzu started a series of demonstration tests for mid-sized buses, Isuzu "Erga Mio" with autonomous driving systems, in five areas; Ōtsu city in Shiga prefecture, Sanda city in Hyōgo Prefecture and other three areas in sequence.

Trucks 

The concept for autonomous vehicles has been applied for commercial uses, such as autonomous or nearly autonomous trucks.

Companies such as Suncor Energy, a Canadian energy company, and Rio Tinto Group were among the first to replace human-operated trucks with driverless commercial trucks run by computers. In April 2016, trucks from major manufacturers including Volvo and the Daimler Company completed a week of autonomous driving across Europe, organized by the Dutch, in an effort to get self-driving trucks on the road. With developments in self-driving trucks progressing, U.S. self-driving truck sales is expected to reach 60,000 by 2035 according to a report released by IHS Inc. in June 2016.

As reported in June 1995 in Popular Science magazine, self-driving trucks were being developed for combat convoys, whereby only the lead truck would be driven by a human and the following trucks would rely on satellite, an inertial guidance system and ground-speed sensors. Caterpillar Inc. made early developments in 2013 with the Robotics Institute at Carnegie Mellon University to improve efficiency and reduce cost at various mining and construction sites.

In Europe, the Safe Road Trains for the Environment is such an approach.

From PWC's Strategy& Report, self driving trucks will be the source of a lot of concern around how this technology will impact around 3 million truck drivers in the US, as well as 4 million employees in support of the trucking economy in gas stations, restaurants, bars and hotels. At the same time, some companies like Starsky, are aiming for Level 3 Autonomy, which would see the driver playing a control role around the truck's environment. The company's project, remote truck driving, would give truck drivers a greater work-life balance, enabling them to avoid long periods away from their home. This would however provoke a potential mismatch between the driver's skills with the technological redefinition of the job.

Companies that buy driverless trucks could massively cut down on costs: human drivers will no longer be required, companies' liabilities due to truck accidents will diminish, and productivity will increase (as the driverless truck doesn't need to rest). The usage of self driving trucks will go hand in hand with the use of real-time data to optimize both efficiency and productivity of the service delivered, as a way to tackle traffic congestion for example. Driverless trucks could enable new business models that would see deliveries shift from day time to night time or time slots in which traffic is less heavily dense.

Suppliers

Motorcycles 
Several self-balancing autonomous motorcycles were demonstrated in 2017 and 2018 from BMW, Honda and Yamaha.

Trains 

The concept for autonomous vehicles has also been applied for commercial uses, like for autonomous trains. The world's first driverless urban transit system is the Port Island Line in Kobe, Japan, opened in 1981. The first self-driving train in the UK was launched in London on the Thameslink route.

An example of an automated train network is the Docklands Light Railway in London.

Also see List of automated train systems.

Trams
In 2018 the first autonomous trams in Potsdam were trialed.

Automated guided vehicle

An automated guided vehicle or automatic guided vehicle (AGV) is a mobile robot that follows markers or wires in the floor, or uses vision, magnets, or lasers for navigation. They are most often used in industrial applications to move materials around a manufacturing facility or warehouse. Application of the automatic guided vehicle has broadened during the late 20th century.

Aircraft

Aircraft has received much attention for automation, especially for navigation. A system capable of autonomously navigating a vehicle (especially aircraft) is known as autopilot.

Delivery drones

Various industries such as packages and food experimented with delivery drones. Traditional and new transportation companies are competing in the market. For example, UPS Flight Forward, Alphabet Wing, and Amazon Prime Air are all developing delivery drones. Zipline, an American medical drone delivery company, has the largest active drone delivery operations in the world, and its drones are capable of Level 4 autonomy.

However, even if technology seems to allow for those solutions to function correctly as various tests of various companies show, the main throwback to the market launch and use of such drones is inevitably the legislation in place and regulatory agencies have to decide on the framework they wish to take to draft regulation. This process is in different phases across the world as each country will tackle the topic independently. For example, Iceland's government and departments of transport, aviation, police have already started issuing licenses for drone operations. It has a permissive approach and together with Costa Rica, Italy, the UAE, Sweden and Norway, has a fairly unrestricted legislation on commercial drone use. Those countries are characterized by a body of regulation that may give operational guidelines or require licensing, registration and insurance.

On the other side, other countries have decided to ban, either directly (outright ban) or indirectly (effective ban), the use of commercial drones. The RAND Corporation thus makes the difference between countries forbidding drones and those that  have a formal process for commercial drone licensing, but requirements are either impossible to meet or licenses do not appear to have been approved. In the US, UPS is the only one with the Part 135 Standard certification that is required to use drones to deliver to real customers.

However, most countries seem to be struggling on the integration of drones for commercial uses into their aviation regulatory frameworks. Thus, constraints are placed on the use of those drones such as that they must be operating within the visual line of sight (VLOS) of the pilot and thus limiting their potential range. This would be the case of the Netherlands and Belgium. Most countries do let pilot operate outside the VLOS but is subject to restrictions and pilot ratings, which would be the case of the US.

The general trend is that legislation is moving fast and laws are constantly being reevaluated. Countries are moving towards a more permissive approach but the industry still lacks infrastructures to ensure the success of such a transition. To provide safety and efficiency, specialized training courses, pilot exams (type of UAV and flying conditions) as well as liability management measures regarding insurances have to be developed.

There is a sense of urgency that breathes from this innovation as competition is high and companies lobby to integrate them rapidly in their products and services offerings. Since June 2017, the US Senate legislation reauthorized the Federal Aviation Administration and the Department of Transportation to create a carrier certificate allowing for package deliveries by drones.

Watercraft

Autonomous boats can provide security, do research, or perform hazardous or repetitive tasks (such as guiding a large ship into a harbor or transporting cargo).

Sea Machines 
Sea Machines offers an autonomous system for workboats. While it does require a human operator to oversee its actions, the system takes care of a lot of active domain perception and navigation duties that normally a few members of the crew would have to do. They use AI to have situational awareness for different ships within the route. They utilize camera, lidar, and proprietary software to inform the operator of its status.

Buffalo Automation 
Buffalo Automation, a team formed from the University of Buffalo, creates technology for semi-autonomous features for boats. They started out creating navigation assist technologies for freighters called AutoMate, which is like having another very experienced “first mate” that will look out for the ship. The system helps make twists and turns of difficult waterways.

Autonomous Marine Systems 
This Massachusetts based company has led the forefront of unmanned sailing drones. The Datamarans are out autonomously sailing around to collect ocean data. They are created to enable large payload packages. Due to the automated system and their solar panels, they are able to navigate for longer periods of time. More than anything they boast their technologies on advanced metocean surveys which collect “wind velocity profiles with altitude, water current, conductivity, temperature profiles with depth, hi-resolution bathymetry, sub-bottom profiling, magnetometer measurements”

Mayflower 
The autonomous vessel called Mayflower is expected to be the first large ship that makes an unmanned transatlantic journey.

Saildrones 
This autonomous unmanned vessel uses both solar and wind energy to navigate.

DARPA 
Sea Hunter is an autonomous unmanned surface vehicle (USV) launched in 2016 as part of the DARPA Anti-Submarine Warfare Continuous Trail Unmanned Vessel (ACTUV) program.

Submersibles

Underwater vehicles have been a focus for automation for tasks such as pipeline inspection and underwater mapping.

Assistance robots

Spot 
This robot is a four-legged nimble robot that was created to be able to navigate through many different terrain outdoors and indoors. It can walk on its own without colliding into anything. It utilizes many different sensors, including 360 vision cameras and gyroscopes. It is able to keep its balance even when pushed over. This vehicle, while it is not intended to be ridden, can carry heavy loads for construction workers or military personnel through rough terrain.

Highway Code change

The UK considers the way to update its British Highway Code for automated code:

Concerns

Lack of control 
Through the autonomy level, it is shown that the higher the level of autonomy, the fewer control humans have on their vehicles (highest level of autonomy needing zero human interventions). One of the few concerns regarding the development of vehicular automation is related to the end-users’ trust in the technology that controls automated vehicles. According to a nationally conducted survey made by Kelley Blue Book (KBB) in 2016, it is shown that the majority of people would still choose to have a certain level of control behind their own vehicle rather than having the vehicle operate in Level 5 autonomy, or in other words, completely autonomous. According to half of the respondents, the idea of safety in an autonomous vehicle diminishes as the level of autonomy increases. This distrust of autonomous driving systems proved to be unchanged throughout the years when a nationwide survey conducted by AAA Foundation for Traffic and Safety (AAAFTS) in 2019 showed the same outcome as the survey KBB did in 2016. AAAFTS survey showed that even though people have a certain level of trust in automated vehicles, most people also have doubts and distrust towards the technology used in autonomous vehicles, with most distrust in Level 5 autonomous vehicles. It is shown by AAAFTS’ survey that people's trust in autonomous driving systems increased when their level of understanding increased.

Malfunctions 

        The possibility of autonomous vehicle's technology to experience malfunctions is also one of the causes of user's distrust in autonomous driving systems. In fact, it is the concern that most respondents voted for in the AAAFTS survey. Even though autonomous vehicles are made to improve traffic safety by minimizing crashes and their severity, they still caused fatalities. At least 113 autonomous vehicle related accidents have occurred until 2018. In 2015, Google declared that their automated vehicles experienced at least 272 failures, and drivers had to intervene around 13 times to prevent fatalities. Furthermore, other automated vehicles’ manufacturers also reported automated vehicles’ failures, including the Uber car incident. The self-driving Uber car accident that happened in 2018 is one of the examples of autonomous vehicle accidents that are also listed in List of self-driving car fatalities. A report made by the National Transportation Safety Board (NTSB) showed that the self-driving Uber car was unable to identify the victim in a sufficient amount of time for the vehicle to slow down and avoid crashing into the victim.

Ethical 
Another concern related to vehicle automation is its ethical issues. In reality, autonomous vehicles can encounter inevitable traffic accidents. In situations like that, many risks and calculations need to be made in order to minimize the amount of damage the accident could cause. When a human driver encounters an inevitable accident, the driver will take a spontaneous action based on ethical and moral logic. However, when a driver has no control over the vehicle (Level 5 autonomy), the system of an autonomous vehicle is the one who needs to make that instant decision. Unlike humans, autonomous vehicles don't have reflexes and it can only make decisions based on what it is programmed to do. However, the situation and circumstances of accidents differ from one another, and one decision might not be the best decision for certain accidents. Based on two research studies in 2019, the implementation of fully automated vehicles in traffic where semi-automated and non-automated vehicles are still present might lead to many complications. Some flaws that still need consideration include the structure of liability, distribution of responsibilities, efficiency in decision making, and the performance of autonomous vehicles with its diverse surroundings. Still, researchers Steven Umbrello and Roman V. Yampolskiy propose that the value sensitive design approach is one method that can be used to design autonomous vehicles to avoid some of these ethical issues and design for human values.

See also
 Self-driving car
 Self-driving truck
 Dashcam
 Intelligent speed adaptation
 Intelligent Transportation System
 PReVENT
 Robo-Taxi
 Transit media
 Uncrewed vehicle

References

External links
 European Commission Intelligent Car website
 U.S. Department of Transportation - Intelligent Transportation Systems Joint Program Office website